Badnaban is a remote scattered coastal village, which lies on the south shore of the sea loch, Loch Inver, in the Assynt district of the west coast of Sutherland, Scottish Highlands. and is in the Scottish council area of Highland.

Badnaban is situated less than 1 mile southwest of Strathan and 2 miles southwest of Lochinver.

References

Populated places in Sutherland